Turkey competed at the 2000 Summer Paralympics in Sydney, Australia. Ali Uzun was the only competitor from Turkey.

See also
Turkey at the Paralympics
Turkey at the 2000 Summer Olympics

References 

Nations at the 2000 Summer Paralympics
2000
Paralympics